Oldfield Creek is a  long 2nd order tributary to the Ararat River in Surry County, North Carolina.

Course
Oldfield Creek rises in a pond on the divide of an unnamed tributary to the Ararat River about 2 miles northeast of Black Water, North Carolina.  Oldfield Creek then flows east-northeast to join the Ararat River about 1.5 miles northwest of Ararat, North Carolina.

Watershed
Oldfield Creek drains  of area, receives about 47.7 in/year of precipitation, has a wetness index of 341.49, and is about 45% forested.

See also
List of rivers of North Carolina

References

Rivers of North Carolina
Rivers of Surry County, North Carolina